Warrane College UNSW is an affiliated residential college at the University of New South Wales, Australia. The name of the College is derived from the Aboriginal word for the Sydney Cove area, "Warrang", highlighting the recognition by Warrane and UNSW of Australia's indigenous people as original inhabitants of land on which they are located. In 2021, Warrane celebrated 50 years since its official opening.

History 

The prehistory of Warrane can be traced to the 1950s, when the Catholic archbishop of Sydney, Sir Norman Thomas Gilroy, first came into contact with members of Opus Dei and a sample of their educational initiatives in Europe. Around that time, the Archdiocese had the desire to establish a Residential College at UNSW under Catholic auspices. Opus Dei, an institution of the Catholic Church, provided the opportunity for this desire to become a reality and was invited to operate the college. Education Development Association (EDA), a not-for-profit company and a registered charity, was set up to represent Warrane College and future initiatives of similar nature. Pastoral care is entrusted to Opus Dei.

Warrane began operating at its present site in 1971 in an eight-storey building on Anzac Parade, Kensington, in the south-western corner of the UNSW campus. Warrane was officially opened by Sir Roden Cutler. Its five residential floors each provide accommodation for groups of 25 residents, two of whom are residential tutors. Since 2008 all bedrooms and bathrooms as well as dining and kitchen facilities, common areas and offices have been renovated.

The College has had four Masters since 1971.

Senior staff members live in the College and oversee the pastoral care of residents. Two residential tutors live on each residential floor. Tutors are mentors to the students, providing academic and personal support. Several academic tutors and residential fellows live in College. They are distinguished academic staff or students of UNSW who conduct the academic program of the College, including formal tutorials and consultation times for different university subjects.

And yes, because old traditions die hard, Warrane remains the proud owner of UNSW's (if not Sydney's) last $1 Coke machine.

Student life 
The majority of students are undergraduate, with about a third in first year. While residents are from all university faculties, a large proportion belong to the faculties of Engineering, Medicine and to the Australian School of Business. There are normally several residents undertaking higher degree programs at UNSW such as Masters and Doctoral programs and younger students benefit from their experience.

One of the main features of college life is the weekly formal dinner, which normally features guest speakers, including politicians, sportsmen, academics and business leaders. The college hosts several faculty nights during the year with guest speakers in specific fields talking to residents about career options and the "big picture" of their profession.

Sport 

Warrane fields teams for all sports of the UNSW Inter-College sports shield. The competition is staged over the three terms and includes a number of major sports, such as Soccer, Basketball, Hockey and Tennis. The competition also includes several carnival days for various sports, including volleyball, cross country, touch football and cricket. The College has won the Inter College Sport Shield several times and are the current holders, having won every year since 2012.

Social life 

Warrane's Activities Committee organises a wide range of social activities. Traditional events include trivia nights, movies, televised sporting events, beach barbecues, ski trips and bushwalks. The annual social calendar includes harbour cruises and wine and cheese nights organised with colleges from UNSW and the University of Sydney. The highlight of the college's social calendar is the Warrane College Ball, held annually at an upmarket city hotel or function centre.

Cultural activities 

Residents recognise the rich cultural diversity represented in the College by celebrating national days such as St Patrick's Day, Chinese New Year, Anzac Day with special cuisine and entertainment. Each floor competes annually for the Cultural Cup. The current holders of the cup are 3rd floor. The competition includes a scavenger hunt, Band Night, a film festival and Orientation Week activities. Residents also often form a college band and musical performances are a regular feature of birthday celebrations. The Activities Committee organises regular visits to cultural events such as concerts at Sydney Opera House, exhibitions at Art Galleries and museums and intra-College debating nights.

Chapel 

The Warrane College Chapel is open each day. Regular activities in the chapel include Mass, the weekly meditation by the College Chaplain and an all-night vigil every month.

Footnotes

Residential colleges of the University of New South Wales
Educational institutions established in 1971
1971 establishments in Australia
Opus Dei universities and colleges